Der Ring des Polykrates may refer to:

 Der Ring des Polykrates (poem) by Schiller
 Der Ring des Polykrates (opera) by Korngold